is a jazz pianist, composer and singer. She has also acted in television and film.

Hashimoto was born in Kobe, grew up in Tokyo and started playing the piano at the age of five. She attended Musashino Academia Musicae, where she graduated in 1975.

Ichiko sometimes performs with her sister .

Discography

Albums 

 Colored Music (1981)**
 Ichiko (1984)
 Beauty (1985)*
 VIVANT (1986)*
 MOOD MUSIC (1987)*
 High Excentrique (1988)*
 High Excentrique Piano Music (1988)*
 D.M. (1989)*
 Je m'aime (1990)*
  (1992)
  (1994)
  (1997)
 najanaja (1998)
  original soundtrack (1999)
 Miles Away (Tokuma Japan, 1999) – tribute to Miles Davis
 Phantasmagoria (Tokuma Japan, 2000)
 Miles Blend (Tokuma Japan, 2001) – tribute to Miles Davis
 RahXephon O.S.T. 1 (2002)
 RahXephon O.S.T. 2 (2002)
 RahXephon O.S.T. 3 (2002)
 Turned Perspective 1994-2001 (2002)
 RahXephon Pluralitas Concentio O.S.T. (2003)
 Ub-X (2006)
 Vega (2007)
 Arc'd-X (2009)
 Code Geass: Akito the Exiled O.S.T. (2012)
 Code Geass: Akito the Exiled O.S.T. 2 (2016)
 duo (2016)
 view (2021)

* remastered and reissued in Japan (2007)
** remastered and first issued on CD in Japan (2008)

Singles 
 "Hold On I'm Comin'" (1988): Single track from High Exentrique.
Used in a Nissan Bluebird commercial.
  (1993) Single. Used in a commercial for The Tokyo Electric Power Company.
 "Heartful Dream" (2003): Maxi single. Used in a commercial for Aiful.

Collaborations 
 Yellow Magic Orchestra: YMO domestic tour "Yellow Magic Orchestra Technopolis 2000-20" (March 21-April 15, 1980).
 "フレバリー･ミュージック" (1987)
 Loom (1990): Album for the PC Enzine game.
 RahXephon sound drama (2002): Ending theme

 Movie soundtracks 
 Akuemon (1993) Director: Makoto Tezuka
  (1984) directed by Takaharu Saeki. The music were performed by Colored Music.
 NUMANITE (1995) and NARAKUE (1997) short film compilations by Makoto Tezuka
  (1999) Director: Makoto Tezuka
  (1999) Director: Makoto Tezuka
 CLOVER (1999) Short Anime Clip, Director: Kitarou Kousaka
 RahXephon Pluralitas Concentio O.S.T. (2003) Director: Tomoki Kyoda Supervising director: Yutaka Izubuchi

 Filmography and TV appearancesMNEMOSYNE (1991) (1992)RahXephon (2002) as Maya KaminaRahXephon: Pluralitas Concentio'' (2003) as Maya Kamina

See also
 An Music School

References

External links 
 Official website

1952 births
21st-century Japanese pianists
21st-century Japanese women musicians
Japanese film score composers
Japanese jazz composers
Japanese jazz musicians
Japanese jazz pianists
Japanese women film score composers
Japanese women singers
Japanese women pianists
Living people
Musicians from Kobe
People from Kobe
Women jazz composers
Women jazz pianists
21st-century women pianists